Bohumír Zeman (born 26 May 1957 in Vrchlabí) is a Czech former alpine skier who competed for Czechoslovakia in the 1976 Winter Olympics and 1980 Winter Olympics.

External links
 

1957 births
Living people
Czech male alpine skiers
Olympic alpine skiers of Czechoslovakia
Czechoslovak male alpine skiers
Alpine skiers at the 1976 Winter Olympics
Alpine skiers at the 1980 Winter Olympics
Universiade medalists in alpine skiing
Universiade gold medalists for Czechoslovakia
Competitors at the 1978 Winter Universiade
People from Vrchlabí
Sportspeople from the Hradec Králové Region